Cusset-Sud was a canton of the arrondissement of Vichy, Allier, Auvergne, France. It had 14,976 inhabitants (2012).

History 
The canton was created in 1985 by scission of canton of Cusset. It includes 7 communes (list below) and fraction of Cusset.

The canton has been disbanded in March 2015 due to French departmental elections.

Administration 
 1985–1998: René Copet (craftsman, mayor of Abrest — unknown dates)
 1998–2015: Gérard Charasse (mayor of Le Vernet, 1977–2001)

Communes
The canton consisted of the following communes:
 Abrest
 Busset
 Cusset (partly)
 La Chapelle, Allier
 Le Vernet, Allier
 Mariol
 Molles
 Saint-Yorre

See also
Cantons of the Allier department

References 

Cusset-Sud
2015 disestablishments in France
States and territories disestablished in 2015